The Adams Claflin House is a historic house at 156 Grant Avenue in the village of Newton Centre in Newton, Massachusetts.  It is a large -story cross-gable wood-frame structure, built in the Shingle style to a design by Samuel Brown for Adams Davenport Claflin.   Claflin was the son of Massachusetts Governor and Newtonville resident William Claflin, and was a major landowner in Newtonville as well as president of the Boston and Suburban Electric Company.  Claflin was a major developer of the streetcar system that served Newton.  Architecturally, the house shows vestiges of the Queen Anne style, with its asymmetrical massing and wealth of projections and gables, as well as elements of the Colonial Revival, exemplified by a Palladian window, and by the pedimented front porch.  The house is one of several designed by Brown for the Claflin family.

On September 4, 1986, the house was added to the National Register of Historic Places.

See also
 National Register of Historic Places listings in Newton, Massachusetts

References

Houses on the National Register of Historic Places in Newton, Massachusetts
Queen Anne architecture in Massachusetts
Colonial Revival architecture in Massachusetts
Houses completed in 1890
Shingle Style architecture in Massachusetts